Lanceoporidae is a family of bryozoans belonging to the order Cheilostomatida.

Genera:
 Calyptotheca Harmer, 1957
 Emballotheca Levinsen, 1909
 Lanceopora d'Orbigny, 1851
 Stephanotheca Reverter-Gil, Souto & Fernández-Pulpeiro, 2012

References

Cheilostomatida